The Trasona Reservoir is a reservoir in Asturias, Spain across the Alvares River. It is located in the parish of Trasona, in the municipality of Corvera de Asturias.

The reservoir is property of Arcelor. Its construction was finished in 1957, with the aim of supply water to the steel plant located in Avilés and to the population of the zone. It is also used for sporting purposes. Near the reservoir are located sporting facilities for canoeing. This facilities were improved in 2010 for hosting the Canoe Sprint European Championships.

The reservoir is supplied by the rivers Alvares and Narcea, from this last one thank to the Canal del Narcea, a 27 km channel.

References
Article at Spanish Wikipedia

External links
Profile at SEPREM

Dams completed in 1957
Reservoirs in Asturias
Dams in Spain